Jonathan Paul Le Tocq (born 4 March 1964) is a politician in Guernsey.

Early life and career

Adopted in Guernsey. After working in London, he was ordained into Christian ministry before returning to Guernsey where he became Senior Pastor of Church on the Rock in 1989.

Life in politics

In April 2012 he was nominated for the role of Guernsey's chief minister. To qualify for the position those elected need to have served in the States for four of the last eight years. A few days later he remained the sole candidate after Deputy Lyndon Trott withdrew his nomination. He became the Deputy Chief Minister after losing to Peter Harwood, at 20-27 votes.

During his tenure as a deputy he sat on the Board of Education, served as President of Overseas Aid, and as Deputy Minister for the Treasury & Resources  Department. From May 2012 to March 2014 he was Guernsey's Home Minister.

In August 2020, Le Tocq joined the Guernsey Partnership of Independents party, formed by Gavin St Pier, Lyndon Trott, and Heidi Soulsby.

Chief Minister

Peter Harwood resigned as Chief Minister on 25 February 2014. An election was held and Le Tocq was elected Chief Minister of Guernsey on 12 March 2014, a post he held until 4 May 2016, when it was won by Gavin St Pier.

In June 2014, Le Tocq hosted a meeting of the British–Irish Council at a hotel in Guernsey. The UK's Deputy Prime Minister Nick Clegg, Taoiseach of Ireland Enda Kenny, First Minister of Northern Ireland Peter Robinson and Deputy First Minister of Northern Ireland Martin McGuinness were among those attending. In January 2015, Le Tocq, and the Chief Minister of Jersey, Senator Ian Gorst, signed an agreement with La Manche and Lower Normandy to develop new links and strengthen existing relationships. Le Tocq and Gorst later paid a joint visit to Brussels on 5–7 May 2015, meeting with two EU Commissioners; Pierre Moscovici, the Commissioner for Economic and Financial Affairs, Taxation and Customs, and Lord Hill, the Commissioner for Financial Stability, Financial Markets and Customs Union.

References

Living people
Members of the States of Guernsey
People educated at Elizabeth College, Guernsey
1964 births